Ingomar may refer to:

People 
Inguiomer or Ingomar, uncle of Arminius (fl. AD 15)

Arts
 Ingomar the Barbarian (play), an 1851 play by 	Maria Ann Lovell
Ingomar, an opera by Colin McAlpin  about the historical character
Ingomar, the Barbarian, a 1908 silent film

Places
Ingomar, California
Ingomar, Mississippi
Ingomar, Montana
Ingomar, Nova Scotia, Canada
Ingomar, Ohio

Organizations
Ingomar Club, a private club in Eureka, California